Váhovce is a village and municipality in Galanta District of  the Trnava Region of south-west Slovakia.

Geography
The municipality lies at an elevation of 130 metres and covers an area of 15.975 km². It has a population of about 2070 people.

History
In the 9th century, the territory of Váhovce became part of the Kingdom of Hungary. In historical records the village was first mentioned in 1259. After the Austro-Hungarian army disintegrated in November 1918, Czechoslovak troops occupied the area, later acknowledged internationally by the Treaty of Trianon. Between 1938 and 1945 Váhovce once more  became part of Miklós Horthy's Hungary through the First Vienna Award. From 1945 until the Velvet Divorce, it was part of Czechoslovakia. Since then it has been part of Slovakia.

References

External links
https://web.archive.org/web/20070207113623/http://www.statistics.sk/mosmis/eng/run.html 

Villages and municipalities in Galanta District